The Collegiate church and cloister of Santa Juliana (Spanish: Colegiata y Claustro de Santa Juliana) is a collegiate church located in Santillana del Mar, Spain. The church is dedicated to Juliana of Nicomedia.

It is notable as an example of Romanesque architecture

Conservation
It has been part of a World Heritage Site since 2015, when the Camino de Santiago (a serial site first designated in 1993) was expanded to take in more variants of the pilgrimage route. The sites included in the UNESCO designation are largely monuments, churches, or hospitals that provided services to pilgrims headed to Santiago de Compostela.

It is also protected as a Bien de Interés Cultural; it was first given a heritage listing in 1889.

References

See also 
 List of Bien de Interés Cultural in Cantabria

Bien de Interés Cultural landmarks in Cantabria
Churches in Cantabria
Collegiate churches in Spain
Romanesque architecture in Cantabria